Elkhan Nuriyev (Russian: Эльхан Эльдарович Нуриев) (Azerbaijani: Elxan Eldar oğlu Nuriyev; born 15 May 1969, Baku, Azerbaijan) is a political scientist and a recognized expert on Russia, Eastern Europe, Caucasus, Central Asia and the Greater Middle East. He has published widely as a scholar, and he conducts regular briefings at the request of the international organizations and think tanks. He is frequently called on by government agencies, media, academic circles and private-sector institutions for comment and consulting on Russian foreign policy, Caucasus, wider Black Sea-Caspian Basin, Central Asia and regional security issues in post-Soviet Eurasia. In 2014, Nuriyev was a DAAD Senior Fellow at the German Council on Foreign Relations in Berlin. In 2015, he was a Humboldt Senior Fellow at the German Institute for International and Security Affairs in Berlin. In 2017, Elkhan Nuriyev served as Corridors Fellow for Dialogue and Cooperation at the Leibniz Institute for East and Southeast European Studies, Regensburg, Germany. He is a Global Energy Associate at the Brussels Energy Club and is also a Senior Expert on Russia, Eastern Europe and Central Asia at L&M Political Risk and Strategy Advisory in Vienna. In 2019, Nuriyev worked as a Humboldt Senior Fellow at Zentrum für Osteuropa- und internationale Studien (ZOiS) / Centre for East European and International Studies. In 2020, he was an Eastern Europe-Global Area (EEGA) Fellow at the Research Centre Global Dynamics, Leipzig University. In 2021, Elkhan Nuriyev worked as a Think Visegrad Visiting Fellow at the Institute for Foreign Affairs and Trade (IFAT) in Budapest.

Education 
Nuriyev earned a MA degree with distinction in Linguistics from Azerbaijan University of Languages in 1992 and received a PhD degree in Political science from the Russian Academy of Sciences in 1996. He also studied at the Foreign Service Academy in Pakistan in 1993, at the Goethe Institute in Bonn during 1999–2000 and at the George C. Marshall European Center for Security Studies in Garmisch-Partenkirchen in 2001. He received his postdoctoral qualification from the University of Bonn in 2010.

Early life and career 
He began his career in the early 1990s as a diplomat in the Ministry of Foreign Affairs of the Republic of Azerbaijan. During 1996–1997 Nuriyev was a William Fulbright Scholar at the Institute for European, Russian and Eurasian Studies at The George Washington University. Between 1999 and 2008 he also worked as a senior research associate at a number of US and European research institutions, including the Monterey Institute of International Studies, the Woodrow Wilson International Center for Scholars, the Peace Research Institute in Frankfurt and the German Institute for International and Security Affairs. Besides, he served as a co-chairman of the South Caucasus Regional Stability Study Group of the Partnership for Peace Consortium at the George C. Marshall European Center for Security Studies in Garmisch from 2002 to 2004.
 
In February 2008, Nuriyev was appointed as the Founding Director of the Center for Strategic Studies, Azerbaijan's premier think-tank, known by the acronym SAM in Azeri language. He headed a Baku-based SAM think-tank until late January 2011. After his resignation, Nuriyev was a Humboldt Senior Fellow at the German Council on Foreign Relations in 2011. 
 
Elkhan Nuriyev has been active as an international speaker at public and private universities, research institutions, think-tanks and international conferences in the US, United Kingdom, Germany, France, Russia and elsewhere in Europe and throughout the world since 1993.

Honors and awards 
Nuriyev is the recipient of various international fellowship awards including William Fulbright Scholarship (USA, 1996), Open Society Institute/OSI Grant Award (USA, 1997), University of California Berkeley Grant Award (USA, 1998), Kennan Institute-Woodrow Wilson Research Grant Award (USA, 1999), Georg Forster Research Fellowship (Germany, 1999), Alexander von Humboldt Research Fellowship Award (Germany, 2000), DAAD/OSI Research Fellowship (Germany, 2005–2006), Distinguished Alumni Award for Achievements in Public Service, U.S. Educated Azerbaijani Alumni Association (Baku, 2010), DAAD Research Fellowship (Germany, 2014), Corridors Fellowship at Leibniz Institute for East and Southeast European Studies (Germany, 2017), Research Fellowship of the Leibniz Science Campus 'Eastern Europe-Global Area' (Germany, 2020), Think Visegrad Fellowship funded by the International Visegrad Fund (Hungary, 2021).

Select bibliography
Elkhan Nuriyev is the author of numerous publications on Eurasian affairs, including four books and monographs, 45 book chapters, 60 scholarly journal articles and over 600 opinion pieces in professional and popular media.

Es geht ums Ganze: Die Ukraine als Kampfzone einer Systemkonfrontation, Der Standard, Wien / Vienna, Austria, 25 November 2022.

From Information Warfare to Information Peacefare: Challenges, Opportunities and Prospects, in F. Labarre and G. Niculescu (eds.) Understanding the Contemporary Information Landscape, Study Group Publication Series, National Defense Academy, Vienna, Austria, 2022. 

Why Did the Armenia-Azerbaijan Peace Process Just Fail?, EUobserver, 2 October 2020, Brussels, Belgium.

The European Union, Russia and China: Competing Regionalisms in the Eastern Partnership Region, Connections, Journal for Historians and Area Specialists, 18 September 2020, Leipzig, Germany.

China, Russia and the EU: Forging a Cooperative Relationship in the Eastern Partnership Region, Asia Global Online, Asia Global Institute, The University of Hong Kong, 16 September 2020, Hong Kong, China.

How the EU could help re-energise peace processes in the Eastern Partnership, New Eastern Europe, 30 January 2020, Krakow, Poland.

Peace building in the Eastern Partnership: what roles for Russia and the EU?, ZOiS Spotlight 45/2019, 4 December 2019, Berlin, Germany.

Russia-West Confrontation and the Future of European Security: Global Trends and Regional Consequences, in F. Labarre and G. Niculescu (eds.), What a 'New European Security Deal' Could Mean for the South Caucasus, Study Group Publication Series, National Defense Academy, Vienna, Austria, 2018.

Endless Endgame: Whither Russia-West Confrontation? in Russia in Global Affairs Journal, April 2018, Moscow, Russia.

The Other Side of Conflict Resolution: Mobilizing Peace Constituencies in the South Caucasus in Journal of Conflict Transformation - Caucasus Edition, March 2018, Washington, DC, USA.

The South Caucasus at the Crossroads: Conflicts, Caspian Oil and Great Power Politics, 2007
 
Conflicts, Caspian Oil, and NATO: Major Pieces of the Caucasus Puzzle in G. Bertsch, et al. (eds.), Crossroads and Conflict – Security and Foreign Policy in the Caucasus and Central Asia, Routledge, New York, NY, USA, 2000, .

The South Caucasus at the Crossroads, LIT, Berlin-Vienna-Zurich-London, 2007, .
 
EU Policy in the South Caucasus: A View from Azerbaijan, CEPS, Brussels, 2007, .

Azerbaijan and the European Union: New Landmarks of Strategic Partnership in the South Caucasus-Caspian Basin, Routledge, Volume 8, 2008, London, UK.

Guerre ou paix dans le Caucase? in J. Daguzan (ed.), Sécurité Globale, Choiseul Éditions, Paris, France, 2010, .

La politique étrangère de l’Azerbaïdjan et ses relations avec la République d’Iran, in M. Korinman (ed.), Iran, le compte à rebours, Outre-Terre 28, French Editions of Geopolitics, Paris, France, 2011, .

Russlands rätselhafte Iran-Politik: Warum der Kreml seine Haltung im Atomstreit überdenkensollte, Internationale Politik, Berlin, Germany, 2012.

Azerbaijan: The Geopolitical Conundrum, OpenDemocracy, London, UK, 2012.

Putin’s Plan for Russia’s Neighbors – A Eurasian Union , OpenDemocracy, London, UK, 2012.

How Iran Can Help Give a Boost to Reset, The Moscow Times, Moscow, 2012.

Motives and Incentives for Engagement – The Russian Perspective of a Eurasian Union, in E. Felberbauer and F. Labarre (eds.), Building Confidence in the South Caucasus: Strengthening the EU’s and NATO’s Soft Security Initiatives, Study Group Publication Series, National Defense Academy, Vienna, Austria, 2013, .

Re-engaging Armenia and Azerbaijan in Reconciliation Process: Prospects and Incentives for Nagorno-Karabakh Breakthrough, in E. Felberbauer and F. Labarre (eds.) What Kind of Sovereignty? Examining Alternative Governance Methods in the South Caucasus, Study Group Publication Series, National Defense Academy, Vienna, Austria, 2014, .

De-escalating Conflicts and Creating Conditions for Peace Process in the South Caucasus, in E. Felberbauer and F. Labarre (eds.) From Self-Defense to Regional Disarmament: Reducing Tensions and Stabilizing the South Caucasus, Study Group Publication Series, National Defense Academy, Vienna, Austria, 2014, .

How the West Helps Putin Fulfill His CIS Strategy, The Moscow Times, Moscow, 2014.

Facing Difficult Choices: The South Caucasus between Russia and the European Union, DGAPkompakt 1, German Council on Foreign Relations (DGAP), Berlin, 2015.

Russia, the EU and the South Caucasus: Forging an Efficient Over-Arching Cooperative Regional Security Scheme, in Connections, The Quarterly Journal of the Partnership for Peace Consortium, George C. Marshall European Center for Security Studies,  Volume 14, Issue 2, Garmisch-Partenkirchen, Germany, 2015.

Russia, the EU and the Caspian Pipeline Gambit, in Journal of Energy Security, Institute for the Analysis of Global Security, Potomac, MD, USA, 2015.

How Russia Could Succeed in Nagorno-Karabakh, in Russia Direct, Online, Moscow, Russia, 2016.

The Changing Face of the CIS, in Rethinking Russia, International Analytical Center, Online, Moscow, Russia, 2016

The Black Sea-Caspian Region in Post-Conflict Energy Security Cooperation Scenarios: What Role for the Future?, in Global Policy Journal, UK, 2017. The article was republished in Stratfor Worldview Online, USA, September 2017.

Nuriyev has been quoted in The Washington Times, Voice of America, Asia Times, Deutsche Welle, Bloomberg Businessweek, The Frankfurter Allgemeine Zeitung, Die Furche, Cicero,BBC World Service, Radio Free Europe, ITAR-TASS, RIA Novosti, and The Huffington Post.

References 

1969 births
Azerbaijani political scientists
Living people
Writers from Baku